Carex sordida is a species of sedge (family Cyperaceae), native to southern Siberia, Mongolia, Manchuria, the Russian Far East, Korea, and Japan. Its chromosome number is 2n=100.

References

sordida
Flora of Siberia
Flora of the Russian Far East
Flora of Mongolia
Flora of Inner Mongolia
Flora of Manchuria
Flora of Korea
Flora of Japan
Plants described in 1870